Hung Sin Nui (25 December 1924 – 8 December 2013) was a former Chinese actress and Cantonese opera singer from Hong Kong and China. Hung was a national treasure level Cantonese opera master.

Life
In 1924, Hung was born as Kuang Jianlian (Kwong Kin-lim in Cantonese) in Guangzhou, China. Hung's ancestral hometown is in Kaiping, Guangdong province, China. With her aunt Ho Fu-lin as her mentor, she began to sing Cantonese opera at the age of 12. She started from Mui Heung and her first stage name was Siu Yin Hung. She took to the stage from 1939, adopting the stage name Hung Sin Nui (Red Line Girl). Red line in Chinese folk legend signifying connecting relationships, especially marriage.

Hung moved to Hong Kong during World War II which would be the beginning of her golden years. She played alongside Ma Si Tsang, her then husband and well-known Cantonese opera singer and actor in productions including The Spoiled Brat and Her Groom, Bitter Phoenix, Sorrowful Oriole and Wang Zhaojun Marries beyond the Great Wall. She established her official diva status during the period and began her movie career. Her screen debut was Unforgettable Love in 1947. Hung made 105 films in her career from 1947 to 2009, but the bulk was during the late 1940s and 1950s. Hung's notable films include The Judge Goes to Pieces, A Mother's Tears, Everlasting Love, Wilderness, The Pretty Tigress, Searching the School and Guan Hanqing.

In 1955, Hung gave up her career in Hong Kong and joined the Guangdong Cantonese Opera Troupe in mainland on invitation by Premier Zhou En-lai, where she performed until 1961. She also founded the Hongdou Cantonese Opera Troupe where she trained and mentored a large number of Cantonese Opera actors and actresses. During the Cultural Revolution Hung's career was halted. She was branded as "Black Line Girl" and banished to the countryside as a street sweeper. She and her family were sent to labour camps. She recalled she would sing inside her heart at time when she was not able to sing. She would hold a note and practice when she raised chickens and no one was looking she would practice and would sing in high pitch during thunder. After the death of Mao Zedong, Hung slowly re-emerged to the Cantonese opera scene, but she appeared in two films in 1990 and 2009 before her career came a close.

Filmography

Films 
This is a partial list of films.
 1947 Unforgettable Love - Kot Mo-Wah	
 1947 Love with No Result - Fong
 1950 Lust of a Grand Lady - Ah Kwai 
 1951 Red and White Azaleas - Mei-Fung 
 1952 Red Rose, the Songstress (aka Songstress Red Rose) - Red Rose.
 1953 A Mother's Tears 
 1954 Autumn - Maid, Chu Man.
 1955 	The Pretty Tigress - Pak Yim-Hung/Pak Lan-Chi

Personal life 
Hung married twice, first to well-known Cantonese opera actor Ma Si-tsang from 1944 to 1955 and then to a writer Hua Shan from 1970 to his death in 1985. Hung had two sons and a daughter from her first marriage:
 Ma Ting-cheong
 Ma Ting-sing (born 1949), military commentator and academic 
 Hung Hung, daughter, a Cantonese opera star, during the Cultural Revolution she named her mother in struggle sessions.  In 1981 she escaped to Taiwan and criticized the Chinese Communist government. Later she made up her relationship with Hung Sin Nui. When she immigrated to Canada she wanted to take her mother with her, but Hung Sin Nui declined.

Hung died on 8 December 2013 of a heart attack at the Guangdong General Hospital in Guangzhou, China. Hung was 88 years old. Hung is interred at Guangzhou Yihne Public Cemetery in Guangzhou, China.

Legacy
Hung was regarded as one of the greatest treasures of Cantonese opera and Hong Kong cinema. She was famous for her unique sweet, crisp, smooth and coquettish  "Hung tone"  of singing which incorporated the techniques of Beijing Opera, Kunqu, and Western opera singing method. She was invited to leave a handprint at the Avenue of Stars in Hong Kong. Much of Hung's work and documents of her career are preserved at the Hung Sin-nui Arts Center in Guangzhou, which was opened in 1998 by the Guangzhou city government to commemorate and preserve her contribution to the art of Cantonese opera.

Her son Ma Ting-sing said "mother can be described as 'never abandoning or wavering, with neither complaint nor regret' toward Cantonese Opera. Whether it was in the midst of war or when the market was light, she still insisted on performing and teaching. Even when she faced 70% empty seats she still performed at will and persisted on that passion for Cantonese Opera."

References

External links

 
 

1924 births
2013 deaths
Actresses from Guangzhou
Cantonese opera actresses
Musicians from Guangzhou
Singers from Guangdong
Victims of the Cultural Revolution
People's Republic of China politicians from Guangdong
Politicians from Guangzhou
Delegates to the 3rd National People's Congress
Delegates to the 4th National People's Congress
Delegates to the 5th National People's Congress
Delegates to the 6th National People's Congress
Delegates to the 7th National People's Congress
Delegates to the 8th National People's Congress
Delegates to the 9th National People's Congress
20th-century Chinese actresses
20th-century Chinese women singers
Chinese expatriates in British Hong Kong